Extron Electronics, known as Extron, is a manufacturer of professional audiovisual equipment.  It is headquartered in Anaheim, California.  Extron operates over 30 offices and regional training and demonstration facilities around the globe.

Extron products are used in video and computer interfacing, switching, and signal distribution to professional displays and projectors.  The company is ISO 9001:2015 certified

In 2004, Extron entered the control systems marketplace.  It now produces control processors, button panels, touch panels, and several software solutions.  In 2010, Extron bought the products' division of Electrosonic.

In 2012 Extron opened its six-story, 200,000 square foot global headquarters building in Anaheim; including a training center, technical support and marketing offices, and a restaurant called The Ranch.

In 2014, Extron entered the lecture capture market with hardware devices for capturing video signals.

References

Home automation companies
Building automation
Remote control
Video equipment manufacturers